Kobar is a Palestinian village in the Ramallah and al-Bireh Governorate in the northern West Bank. The average annual temperature is 16 °C and the average annual humidity is approximately 61% .

Since 1996, Kobar has been governed by a village council which is currently administrated by 11 members appointed by the Palestinian National Authority. There are two further employees working in the council; the village council owns a permanent headquarters and is included within a Joint Services Council for neighboring localities.

Location 
It is bordered by Burham to the east, Jibiya and Umm Safa to the north, al-Ittihad to the west, and al-Zaitounah and Bir Zeit to the south.

History 
According to the Kobar Village Council, the name "Kobar" means "the place where the gypsum was" on account of it once containing abundant gypsum deposits.

Potsherds from the Iron Age, Persian/Hellenistic, Byzantine, Crusader/Ayyubid and Mamluk periods have been found in the village. The oldest sherds were found on the north and south slopes of the village, while Byzantine sherds were found on the west side.

Ottoman era
Kobar, like the rest of Palestine, was incorporated into the Ottoman Empire in 1517, and in the census of 1596, the village was located in the Nahiya of Quds of the Liwa of Quds. The population was 31 households, all Muslim. They paid a fixed tax-rate of 33,3% on wheat, barley, vineyards, fruit trees, occasional revenues, goats and/or beehives; a total of 4,000 akçe. Potsherds from the early Ottoman period has also been found here.

In 1838, it was noted as Kubar, a Muslim village in the Bani Zeid district, north of Jerusalem.

In 1863 the French explorer Victor Guérin visited the village. He noted it had 600 inhabitants, and a mosque dedicated to a Sheikh Ahmed. An Ottoman village list of about 1870 showed Kobar with a population of 220, in 48 houses, though the population count included men, only. 

In 1882, the PEF's Survey of Western Palestine (SWP) described Kobar as a "small village on a hill-top, with rock-cut tombs, and a tank, surrounded by olives."

In 1896 the population of Kubar was estimated to be about 444 persons.

British Mandate era
In the 1922 census of Palestine conducted by the British Mandate authorities, Kubar had a population of 447; 444 Muslims and 3 Christians where the Christians were all Orthodox. This had increased by the time of the 1931 census to 546, all Muslim, in 122 houses.

In the 1945 statistics the population was 610, all Muslims, while the total land area was 9,678 dunams, according to an official land and population survey. Of this, 3,512 were allocated for plantations and irrigable land, 1,434 for cereals, while 33 dunams were classified as built-up areas.

Jordanian era
In the wake of the 1948 Arab–Israeli War, and after the 1949 Armistice Agreements, Kobar came under Jordanian rule.

The Jordanian census of 1961 found 934 inhabitants in Kaubar.

1967-present
Since the Six-Day War in 1967, Kobar has been under Israeli occupation. 

After the 1995 accords, 53.7 % of village land belongs to Area B, while the remaining 46.3 % is Area C.

In 2008, the preacher at the local mosque in Kobar, Majed Barghouti, 44, died while in detention. His relatives alleged that he had been tortured.

Notable people from Kobar
Fadwa Barghouti
Marwan Barghouti
Hussein Barghouthi (1954 – 2002)

Twin towns 
 Walsall, United Kingdom

References

Bibliography

External links
 Welcome To Kaubar
 Survey of Western Palestine, Map 14: IAA, Wikimedia commons 
 Kobar Village (Fact Sheet), Applied Research Institute–Jerusalem (ARIJ)
 Kobar Village Profile, ARIJ
 Kobar (aerial photo), ARIJ
 Locality Development Priorities and Needs in Kobar Village, ARIJ

Villages in the West Bank
Ramallah and al-Bireh Governorate